The Vanni, also spelled Wanni, is the name given to the mainland area of the Northern Province of Sri Lanka. The population and infrastructure of the Vanni were devastated by the Sri Lankan Civil War.

History
Tamil feudal chiefs called Vanniar chiefs who have their origin here cultivated the Vanni in the first millennium of the Common Era governing what were called Vannimai, the Jaffna kingdom's land divisions located south of the Jaffna Peninsula in the present-day Northern, North Central and Eastern provinces of Sri Lanka.

Geography
Geographically, the Vanni is distinct from the Jaffna Peninsula, the other area of the Northern Province. Jaffna peninsula is irrigated by underground aquifers fed by wells whereas the Vanni has irrigation tanks fed by perennial rivers. Major rivers include: Akkarayan Aru, Aruvi Aru, Kanakarayan Aru, Kodalikkallu Aru, Mandekal Aru, two called Nay Aru, Netheli Aru, Pali Aru, Pallavarayankaddu Aru, Parangi Aru, Per Aru, Piramenthal Aru, Theravil Aru. There are also a number of lagoons around the Vanni, the largest being Jaffna Lagoon, Nanthi Kadal, Chundikkulam Lagoon, Kokkilai Lagoon, Nai Aru Lagoon and Chalai Lagoon.

Much of the interior (approximately ) of the Vanni is covered by dense forest.

Demographics
The Vanni had a population of nearly 700,000 in 2007, making it one of the most sparsely populated areas of Sri Lanka. However, the area's population figures have been highly volatile due to massive displacement caused by the Sri Lankan Civil War.

External links
 A closer look at southern part of the Vanni 

Geography of Kilinochchi District
Geography of Mannar District
Geography of Mullaitivu District
Geography of Vavuniya District